Brand New Day is the sixth solo studio album by British singer-songwriter Sting, released by A&M Records on 27 September 1999.
Fueled heavily by the success of the second single, "Desert Rose" (which prominently features popular Algerian Raï singer Cheb Mami), the album peaked at number nine on the Billboard 200 and sold over 3.5 million copies in the United States. Upon its release, Brand New Day was a critical and commercial success, and hailed as the triumphant return for Sting.

The album earned Sting a Grammy Award for Best Pop Vocal Album and his third Grammy Award for Best Male Pop Vocal Performance for the title track.

Background
Originally, Sting's usual producer Hugh Padgham was to produce the album, but Sting was happy with the work done by Kipper, and Padgham was not required. The album was recorded in various studios around Europe.

The full version of "The End of the Game" was included on the single for "Brand New Day" and the DTS and DVD-Audio releases of the album. The music video for the title track is a parody of bleach commercials, and advertises "Brand new 'Day Ultra'" brand. The song "Brand New Day" features Stevie Wonder on harmonica.

Track listing

Personnel 
 Sting – lead vocals, backing vocals, bass guitar, Roland VG-8 guitar synthesizer 
 Kipper – keyboards, drum programming
 Jason Rebello – acoustic piano, clavinet
 Don Blackman – Hammond organ
 David Hartley – Hammond organ, string arrangements and conductor (3, 6)
 Dominic Miller – guitars
 B. J. Cole – pedal steel guitar
 Vinnie Colaiuta – drums 
 Manu Katché – drums
 Mino Cinelu – percussion
 Ettamri Mustapha – darbouka
 Branford Marsalis – clarinet
 Chris Botti – trumpet
 Kathryn Tickell – Northumbrian pipes, fiddle
 Stevie Wonder – harmonica (10)
 Farhat Bouallagui – string arrangements, conductor and leader (2)
 Isobel Griffiths – orchestral contractor (2, 3, 6)
 Gavyn Wright – string leader (3, 6)
 Moulay Ahmed – strings (2, 3, 6)
 Kouider Berkan – strings (2, 3, 6)
 Salem Bnouni – strings (2, 3, 6)
 Sameh Catalan – strings (2, 3, 6)
 Cheb Mami – vocals (2)
 Sté Strausz' – French rap (5)
 James Taylor – vocals (8)
 Tawatha Agee – backing vocals 
 Dennis Collins – backing vocals 
 Joe Mendes – backing vocals
 Janice Pendarvis – backing vocals, vocal contractor 
 Pamela Quinlan – backing vocals 
 Althea Rodgers – backing vocals
 Marlon Saunders – backing vocals
 Vaneese Thomas – backing vocals
 Darryl Tookes – backing vocals
 Ken Williams – backing vocals
 Gary Cook – Roland VG8 Programer, Sound Creator

Production 
 Sting – producer
 Kipper – producer
 Neil Dorfsman – engineer
 Simon Osborne – engineer, mixing
 Geoff Foster – strings engineer (2, 3, 6)
 Etienne Colin – assistant engineer
 Nicholas Duport – assistant engineer
 Andrew Fellus – assistant engineer 
 Brian Garten – assistant engineer
 Ricky Graham – assistant engineer
 Ben Kape – assistant engineer
 Stephanie Levy-B – assistant engineer
 Peter "Hopps" Lorimer – assistant engineer
 Aya Takemura – assistant engineer
 Chris Blair – mastering
 Abbey Road Studios (London, UK) – mastering location
 Joe Mama-Nitzberg – art direction 
 Jodi Peckman – art direction
 Richard Frankel – package design
 Olaf Heine – photography
 Carter Smith – photography

Accolades

Grammy Awards

|-
| style="width:35px; text-align:center;" rowspan="2"|2000 ||rowspan=2| Brand New Day || Best Pop Vocal Album || 
|-
|Best Male Pop Vocal Performance|| 
|-

Charts

Weekly charts

Year-end charts

Certifications and sales

}
}
}
}

}

References

Sting (musician) albums
1999 albums
A&M Records albums
Grammy Award for Best Pop Vocal Album
Albums produced by Kipper (musician)
World music albums by English artists
Albums recorded at AIR Studios